Enoch Edwards (April 1852 – 28 June 1912) was a British trade unionist and politician.

Biography
Edwards was born at Talk-o'-the Hill Staffordshire on 10 April 1852. He was the
son of a pitman, and worked as a boy in a coal-mine.

In 1870 he became treasurer of the North Staffordshire Miners' Association and was elected secretary to the same body in 1877.  In 1880 he became president of the Midland Miners' Association; he was later president of the Miners' Federation of Great Britain in 1904.

In 1884 he went to Burslem, where he became a member of the school board and town council in 1886, and later he became alderman and mayor. He was also a member of the Staffordshire County Council. He was elected to Parliament as the Lib-Lab MP for Hanley in 1906. He then was a Labour Party MP in 1909. He died at Southport 28 June 1912 aged 60.

References

External links 

1852 births
1912 deaths
Presidents of the National Union of Mineworkers (Great Britain)
Labour Party (UK) MPs for English constituencies
Liberal-Labour (UK) MPs
UK MPs 1906–1910
UK MPs 1910
UK MPs 1910–1918
Members of Staffordshire County Council
People from Talke
Trade unionists from Staffordshire
19th-century British businesspeople